The 1908 Richmond Spiders football team was an American football team that represented Richmond College—now known as the University of Richmond—as a member of the Eastern Virginia Intercollegiate Athletic Association (EVIAA) during the 1908 college football season. Led by fourth-year head coach E. A. Dunlap, Richmond compiled a record of 3–5.

Schedule

References

Richmond
Richmond Spiders football seasons
Richmond Spiders football